Amara may refer to:

Places
Amara, Iran, a village in Markazi Province, Iran
Amara, Nubia, towns in Sudan
Amara, Romania, a town in Ialomiţa County, south-eastern Romania
Amara, a village in Balta Albă Commune, Buzău County, Romania
Amarah or "Al-Amarah", a city in Iraq
Amara, a neighbourhood in San Sebastián, Spain
Mount Amara, Ethiopia
Ömerli, Şanlıurfa, village in Turkey formerly named Amara

People
Abdelmalek Amara (born 2000), an Algerian footballer
Amara (singer), an Indonesian singer
Amara Asavananda (born 1937), Thai actress
Amara Darboh (born 1994), American football player
Amara Karan (born 1984), a Sri-Lankan-British actress
Amara La Negra, a Love & Hip Hop cast member
Amara Sinha (c. CE 375) a Sanskrit grammarian
Fadela Amara, a French politician
Roy Amara (1925–2007), American business writer and futurist
Amara Walker (born 1981), American journalist

Fiction
 Amara (Codex Alera), a Cursor and main character in the Codex Alera series by Jim Butcher
 Amara (film), a 2014 Tamil film
 Magma (comics), a Marvel Comics character, real name Amara Juliana Olivians Aquilla
 Amara Tenoh, the civilian name of Sailor Uranus in the English cloverway dub of Sailor Moon
 A doll in the Groovy Girls line by Manhattan Toy
 A character also known as The Darkness in the American television series Supernatural
 A character in the American television series Once Upon a Time in Wonderland
 A character in the American television series The Vampire Diaries
 A Siren character in the game Borderlands 3
 A recurring character in the American-Canadian cartoon SuperKitties

Other
 Amara (beetle), a genus of carabid beetles
 Amara (subtitling), an online platform by the Participatory Culture Foundation for captioning and subtitling video
 Amara language, an Austronesian language from West New Britain Province, Papua New Guinea
 Amhara people, an ethnic group of Ethiopia (Amara in the Amharic language)

See also
 Amaras, a village in Nagorno Karabakh
 Amhara (disambiguation)